Map of places in Vale of Glamorgan compiled from this list
 See the list of places in Wales for places in other principal areas.

This is a list of towns and villages in the principal area of Vale of Glamorgan, Wales.

 

A
Aberthaw, Aberthin

B
Bonvilston, Barry, Barry Island, Boverton, Broughton

C
Cadoxton,  City, Clawdd Coch, Cogan, Colwinston, Corntown, Cowbridge

D
Dinas Powys, Dowlais, Drope, Duffryn/Dyffryn

E
Ewenny, Eglwys Brewis

F
Flemingston, Fontegary

G
Gileston, Gwern-y-Steeple, Graig Penllyn

H
Hensol Castle

L
Lavernock, Llampha, Llanbethery, Llanblethian, Llancadle, Llancarfan, Llandough (near Cowbridge), Llandough (near Cardiff), Llandow, Llangan, Llanmaes, Llanmihangel, Llansannor, Llantrithyd, Llantwit Major, Llysworney

M
Marcross, Michaelston-le-Pit, Monknash, Moulton

O
Ogmore
Ogmore-by-Sea

P
Penarth, Pendoylan, Penllyn, Penmark, Peterston-super-Ely, Porthkerry

R
Rhoose

S
St Andrew's Major, St Athan, St Brides Major, St Donats, St Hilary, St Lythans, St Mary Church, St Nicholas, Sigingstone, Southerndown, Sully

T
Talygarn, Tredodridge, Treguff, Treoes

W
Walterston, Welsh St Donats, Wenvoe, Wick

Y
Ystradowen

Vale of Glamorgan